Sekolah Menengah Pertama Negeri 2 Kotabaru, or SMP Negeri 2 Kotabaru is a  junior highschool in Kotabaru, Karawang, West Java, Indonesia. The first name of this school is SMP Negeri 3 Cikampek, but Cikampek District was divided into three districts.

Facility
The facilities and infrastructure in this school are:
 Laboratory
 Classroom
 Basket field
 Unit Kesehatan Sekolah (school health center)
 Mosque
 Computer Laboratory
 Art room
 Canteen
 Garden
 etc.

References

External links
  

Education in Indonesia